Behati Prinsloo (born 16 May 1988) is a Namibian model. In 2008, she became a Pink contract model, and moved on to become a Victoria's Secret Angel in 2009. She walked in ten Victoria's Secret Fashion Shows (2007–2015; 2018), and opened consecutive Victoria's Secret Fashion shows in 2014 and 2015.

Early life
Prinsloo was born in Grootfontein, Namibia, then part of South West Africa. She is the only child of father Boet Prinsloo, who is a church minister. Her mother, Magda (née Rossouw), runs a bed and breakfast. Her family are Afrikaners and she grew up speaking Afrikaans as her native language, although she was later educated in English. She attended Grootfontein Secondary School and left after Grade 9 to pursue modelling.

Her modelling career began when she was discovered while vacationing in Cape Town with her grandparents. "We went to the grocery store after church and this guy came up to me and asked if I was a model and wrote his number on a piece of paper...".

Career
Prinsloo debuted as a Prada/Miu Miu Exclusive. Soon after, Juergen Teller photographed her for her debut ad campaign, Marc by Marc Jacobs, and she soon was photographed by Mario Testino and Paolo Roversi for British Vogue and David Sims for W Magazine.

Prinsloo has walked in fashion shows for Alexander Wang, Louis Vuitton, Miu Miu, Versace, and other brands.

She has been on the covers of Vogue Spain, Vogue Turkey, Vogue Brasil, Vogue Mexico, Vogue Russia, Vogue Thailand, Elle France, Elle Spain, Elle Italia, Elle Sweden, L'Officiel Netherlands, Marie Claire Greece, Marie Claire South Africa, i-D Magazine, V Magazine, Russh Magazine, 10 Magazine, The Edit, Jalouse, and So It Goes Magazine.

Her ad campaigns include I Love Juicy Couture Fragrance, I Am Juicy Couture Fragrance, Juicy Couture Black Label, Tommy Hilfiger, Alexander Wang 'Do Something', T by Alexander Wang, Marc by Marc Jacobs, H&M, Nina Ricci, The Gap, Aquascutum, M Missoni, Sportmax, DKNY Jeans, Pepe Jeans, Lancaster, Stefanel, Esprit, Lacoste, Desigual, Seafolly, Nine West, and Raw Spirit Fragrance.

In 2010, Prinsloo designed "Behati Loves Pink" swimsuit capsule collection for Victoria's Secret. In 2014, she designed a line of denim for THVM. Most recently, she designed a fashion and accessories collection for Juicy Couture. Models.com ranks Prinsloo on their lists of 'The Top Sexiest Models' as well as their list of 'The Money Girls'.

The night before the 4 December 2012 airing of the annual Victoria's Secret Fashion Show, Prinsloo and fellow Victoria's Secret models Jacquelyn Jablonski and Jasmine Tookes guest starred on the 3 December "Ha'awe Make Loa" episode of CBS' Hawaii Five-0 playing themselves.
In June 2014, Prinsloo made a cameo appearance in a preview of Missy Elliott protégée Sharaya J's "Shut It Down" via a T by Alexander Wang campaign. Prinsloo appeared in various music videos such as The Virgins' "Rich Girls" and Maroon 5's "Animals", "Lost", and "Girls Like You".

After taking a two-year hiatus from the Victoria's Secret Fashion show, Prinsloo returned to walk in the brand's 2018 show.

Prinsloo was among the models and celebrities who made appearances modeling lingerie at Rihanna's Savage x Fenty Vol. 3 fashion show in 2021.

Philanthropy

Prinsloo embarked on a charitable trip following the 2010 Haiti earthquake. Partnering with LakayPam, an organization dedicated to helping children in developing nations meet their basic needs, she collected and delivered hundreds of letters of hope from all over the world and helped raise funds. She was accompanied by a cameraman and his friend, and the resulting short film, Letters to Haiti, debuted 7 December 2011 at Milk Gallery in New York.

She also supports Save the Rhino Trust, an organization trying to protect the black rhinoceros, a critically endangered species native to Namibia and other countries in Southern Africa.

Personal life

In 2012, Prinsloo began dating American musician Adam Levine of the group Maroon 5; they married in Mexico in 2014. They have two daughters: Dusty Rose (born September 2016) and Gio Grace (born February 2018). On January 28, 2023, they welcomed their third child.

She is close friends with fellow models Candice Swanepoel and Lily Aldridge.

Prinsloo appeared in the 2018 Maroon 5 video "Girls Like You," along with husband Levine, their daughter Dusty Rose and more than two dozen women celebrities (including Jennifer Lopez, Mary J. Blige, Cardi B, Gal Gadot, Ellen DeGeneres, Tiffany Haddish, Lilly Singh and more).

In 2021, Levine and Prinsloo founded  Calirosa, a line of California red wine barrel-aged tequila.

Filmography

Music videos

References

External links

 
 
 
 

1988 births
Living people
Namibian female models
White Namibian people
Namibian Afrikaner people
Namibian activists
People from Grootfontein
People from Vanderbijlpark
Prada exclusive models
Namibian people of Dutch descent
Namibian expatriates in the United States
Namibian expatriates in the United Kingdom
Namibian expatriates in South Africa
Victoria's Secret Angels
Women Management models